Events in the year 2003 in Namibia.

Incumbents 

 President: Sam Nujoma
 Prime Minister: Theo-Ben Gurirab
 Chief Justice of Namibia: Johan Strydom

Events 

 5 – 7 October – The country competed in the 2003 All-Africa Games held at the National Stadium in the city of Abuja, Nigeria.

Deaths

References 

 
2000s in Namibia
Years of the 21st century in Namibia
Namibia
Namibia